Hungarian-Vietnamese relations are the diplomatic relations between Hungary and Vietnam. Hungary has an embassy in Hanoi. Vietnam has an embassy in Budapest.

Both countries are full members of the World Trade Organization and United Nations.

History

Hungary and Vietnam established an official relationship in the 1950s when the two countries were both in the Eastern Bloc. Since then, Hungary and Vietnam have developed further relations, with Vietnamese students and workers often going to Hungary to pursue higher education.

During the 1980s, at the height of Cambodian–Vietnamese War, Hungary adopted a neutral policy and remained distanced from the conflict. After the Cold War and collapse of Soviet Union, both Hungary and Vietnam effectively gave up practicing communist ideology in favor of market capitalism, although Vietnam remains under the control of the Communist Party, while Hungary has transitioned back to capitalism.

21st Century
Relations between Hungary and Vietnam are described as excellent. Hungarian Prime Minister Viktor Orbán visited Vietnam in 2017.

Vietnam considers Hungary an important economic and key partner in Central Europe, due to its diverse ties and rich history. The two countries developed a strategic partnership in 2018, with the Hungarian Prime Minister referring to Vietnam as a success in the Far East.

On August 1, 2020, the European Union–Vietnam Free Trade Agreement came into force, which eliminated 99% of tariffs in trade between Vietnam and EU countries, including Hungary.

Vietnamese people in Hungary

The Vietnamese community in Hungary is small and, despite historic immigration, Vietnamese tend to be less active and well-integrated into Hungarian society. In 2018, the Hungarian government officially recognized a pagoda that had recently been built by the Vietnamese community.

However, illegal immigration remains a concern. In 2010, Hungary and the European Union (of which Hungary is a member) launched a crackdown on a Vietnamese illegal immigration network.
Currently, the Vietnamese community in Hungary has about 5,000 people, of which the vast majority have legal residency or residence papers. Vietnamese people in Hungary mostly live and work in the capital city of Budapest, a few live, work, and study in some other big cities such as Szeged and Debrecen. The first Vietnamese people were present in Hungary more than half a century ago, but the Vietnamese community has just formed and has really stabilized for nearly three decades. At first, the Vietnamese in Hungary were mostly students, doctoral students, interns; After graduating from university or defending a doctoral or doctoral thesis, many people stayed and chose Hungary as their second homeland.

After the changes in the late 80s of the last century in Hungary, in addition to some people participating in teaching and research at many universities and research institutes of Hungary, most people in the community switched to doing business. . Later, the Vietnamese community in Hungary was supplemented by people who came to visit relatives, reunited with family and a large number of relatives went to Hungary with the goal of opening a company for business.

Currently, the majority of Vietnamese people in Hungary operate small and medium-sized businesses, trading in trade centers, markets, and in retail stores in the street. In the current trend of European integration, it is becoming more and more difficult for most of our relatives to do business due to the competition of goods with China, Turkey, India, etc.., as well as the emergence of The fast life of supermarket systems in Hungary. In particular, in recent years, Hungary has been heavily affected by the global financial crisis, and at the same time, the host country has tightened the legal and tax system, putting Vietnamese businesses in a difficult situation. and dedicated to the business. This is a big challenge for the majority of Vietnamese people, requiring new dynamism and adaptation in business activities.

However, a part of the community has established service companies, import-export companies, opened restaurants, hotels, factories, wholesale supermarkets, etc., successful business, bringing success. high economic efficiency. Thang Long Center is a specific example of the dynamism of Vietnamese merchants. Currently, this is a commercial center invested and owned by Vietnamese people, which has been in operation for more than 10 years.

Besides, many Vietnamese companies in Hungary have actively contributed to promoting the export process of Vietnamese goods to Hungary and vice versa. A number of successful Vietnamese businessmen have invested in the country, setting up factories to produce goods for export to Hungary and Europe. Some international students who study science and technology also have well-deserved positions in Hungarian universities and research institutes. Currently, the Vietnamese community in Hungary has 4 professors, many doctors of science, and doctorates. Teenagers, pupils, and students have also had many excellent academic achievements, many Vietnamese children have achieved high results in the Hungarian exams for excellent students.

Not only making efforts in studying, but some individuals in the community also achieved positive results in the fields of arts and sports, contributing to making a good impression, creating the ability for the young generation to integrate into the world. more active in Hungarian society. The image and position of the Vietnamese community in your land have gradually improved markedly.

In order to achieve valuable successes in Hungary, the role of the community's core organizations is indispensable. The Association of Vietnamese in Hungary, established in April 2008, has agreed on the organization between grassroots associations, helping to make the activities of organizations in the community more unified and effective, attracting the participation of local people. Many Vietnamese people live in Hungary. Among the grassroots associations and unions, it is worth mentioning the "leading" role of the Vietnam Business Association in Hungary, established in 2002 and solid support in both finance and spirit for all activities of the community copper. During nearly 15 years of existence, the Association has had many practical activities to help its members in business, as well as, has organized many seminars to help business people navigate in new circumstances.

See also 
 Foreign relations of Hungary 
 Foreign relations of Vietnam

References

External links
Embassy of Hungary, Hanoi
Embassy of Vietnam in Hungary

 
Vietnam
Hungary